Hàm Tân is a rural district of Bình Thuận province in the Southeast region of Vietnam. As of 2003 the district had a population of 168,717. The district covers an area of 941 km². The district capital lies at Tân Nghĩa.

References

Districts of Bình Thuận province